In cricket, a five-wicket haul (also known as a "five-for" or "fifer") refers to a bowler taking five or more wickets in a single innings. This is regarded as a notable achievement, and fewer than 40 bowlers have taken more than 15 five-wicket hauls at international level during their cricketing careers. Brett Lee has the fifth-highest number of international five-wicket hauls among Australian cricketers as of 2013. A right-arm fast bowler, he is regarded as one of the fastest international bowlers in the modern cricketing era.

Lee picked up a five-wicket haul on Test debut, playing against India in December 1999; a match that Australia won. His career-best figures for an innings were 5 wickets for 30 runs against West Indies at the Brisbane Cricket Ground in November 2005; while never managing to take ten wickets in a single match. Eight of his ten Test five-wicket hauls were taken at home. After capturing 310 wickets, Lee retired from Test cricket in 2010 and remains Australia's fourth-most successful bowler in the format.

After making his One Day International (ODI) debut against Pakistan in January 2000, Lee's first ODI five-wicket haul came in one of the matches of the series against India; the performance ensured Australia's victory. With nine five-wicket hauls, his position is third in the all-time ODI list. His career-best bowling in ODI cricket was 5 wickets for 22 runs against South Africa at Melbourne Cricket Ground in January 2006; his performance earned him the man of the match award. Lee claimed 19 five-wicket hauls in his International career, and Australia never lost any of the games on such instances. However, he never took more than five wickets in a single innings in any format of the international game. Lee played his first Twenty20 International (T20I) against New Zealand in 2005, and is Australia's fourth-highest wicket-taker in the format. He never took a five-wicket haul in T20I, where his best bowling figures remain 3 wickets for 23 runs. Lee announced his retirement from international cricket in July 2012.

Key

Tests

ODIs

Notes

References

External links
 Player profile of Brett Lee at CricketArchive

Australian cricket lists
Lists of international cricket five-wicket hauls by player